The Complete Hits Collection: 1973–1997 is a 4-disc greatest hits album by American Billy Joel. It was released on October 14, 1997, a boxed set was released that included all three Greatest Hits volumes as well as a fourth disc (entitled An Evening of Questions & Answers... & A Little Music) that contains live tracks and a Q&A with Joel. Originally available in a long box format, the box set is also available in a compact box format.

Track listing

Personnel
 Remastering - Joseph Palmaccio (CD 1 and CD 2), Ted Jensen (CD 3 and CD 4) at Sterling Sound

Certifications and sales

References

Billy Joel compilation albums
1997 greatest hits albums
1997 live albums
Albums produced by Mick Jones (Foreigner)
Albums produced by Phil Ramone
Columbia Records compilation albums
Interview albums